Tumanyan or T’umanyan or Tumanian may refer to:

People 
 Barseg Tumanyan, Armenian bass opera singer; soloist with the Alexandrov Ensemble
 Hovhannes Tumanyan (1869–1923), Armenian poet, writer, translator, literary and public activist
 Samvel Tumanyan (born 1949), Armenian politician
 Tuman Tumanian (1879–1906), participant of the Armenian national liberation movement

Places 
 Dsegh, Armenia
 Tumanyan, Armenia
 Tumanyan Park in Yerevan, Armenia

Armenian-language surnames